The Dongfeng Fengdu MX3 is a compact CUV produced by Dongfeng Motor Corporation under the Dongfeng Fengdu sub-brand.

Overview 
The MX3 debuted during the 2017 Auto Shanghai with the MX3 being available to the market in June 2017 with prices ranging from 55,000 yuan to 65,000 yuan.

References

External links 

Fengdu MX3
Compact sport utility vehicles
Crossover sport utility vehicles
Cars introduced in 2017
Front-wheel-drive vehicles